Whitiora is a suburb in central Hamilton in New Zealand. The suburb is home to Waikato Stadium, formerly Rugby Park. It is a major sporting and cultural events venue in Hamilton with a total capacity of 25,800. The stadium is a multi-purpose facility, though used mainly for rugby union. Many of Hamilton's hotels are in Whitiora, along the main road from the north.

Etymology 
The name Whitiora began to be used from about 1913, when the new suburb was being developed. Prior to that it had been known as No.1, possibly because No. 1 Company of Militia was once based there. Whitiora was said to translate as prosperity and plenty, though, in a 2019 leaflet and in naming the current Whitiora Bridge, it was said name was derived from the call of the pipiwharauroa, and 'ora', meaning life, or health.

History

Whatanoa Pā 
Ngāti Te Ao, occupied Whatanoa Pā on what is now Beetham Park. Hotumauea of Ngāti Koura took the pā in the late 1600s. The remains of an urupā were exhumed in 1922, ditches show on a 1943 aerial photo and, when FMG Stadium was built in 2002, a waharoa (pā gateway) was placed to mark the site of the pā.

Post colonisation 
The street layout was shown on an 1865 plan of the military settlement, just a year after the invasion of the Waikato and confiscation of the land. Ulster and Willoughby Streets were named in 1864, the latter after a colonial secretary, Willoughby Shortland.

Whitiora Lagoon, to the west of Abbotsford Street, was drained in 1915 and a 'frog pond' at about the same time, seemingly as part of a scheme to drain the whole area.

In the 1940s Snake Gully accommodation camp had airmen billeted in huts beside the Waitewhiriwhiri Stream, where the Badminton Club now stands. It was converted to an emergency housing camp in 1945.

Geography 
Whitiora lies on the west bank of the Waikato River, just to the south of its confluence with the Waitewhiriwhiri Stream. Pollution of the stream has long been a problem. In 1921 the stench was said to be getting abominable due to factory waste.

Hamilton Town Belt 
A stretch of the Hamilton Town Belt runs through Whitiora, including Beetham, Edgecumbe and Willoughby Parks. It was planned as a continuous belt, but has gradually been eroded, beginning with the rugby ground in 1922, which had previously been covered in gorse. It has been calculated that only 56% remains as open green space.

Demographics 
In 2013 and earlier it had been part of Hamilton Central area. 

Whitiora had a population of 2,538 at the 2018 New Zealand census, an increase of 495 people (24.2%) since the 2013 census, and an increase of 741 people (41.2%) since the 2006 census. There were 1,107 households, comprising 1,269 males and 1,269 females, giving a sex ratio of 1.0 males per female. The median age was 31.3 years (compared with 37.4 years nationally), with 279 people (11.0%) aged under 15 years, 894 (35.2%) aged 15 to 29, 1,146 (45.2%) aged 30 to 64, and 219 (8.6%) aged 65 or older.

Ethnicities were 47.4% European/Pākehā, 19.5% Māori, 4.7% Pacific peoples, 34.5% Asian, and 4.8% other ethnicities. People may identify with more than one ethnicity.

The percentage of people born overseas was 45.3, compared with 27.1% nationally.

Although some people chose not to answer the census's question about religious affiliation, 39.1% had no religion, 29.9% were Christian, 1.5% had Māori religious beliefs, 11.5% were Hindu, 2.7% were Muslim, 1.3% were Buddhist and 9.5% had other religions.

Of those at least 15 years old, 732 (32.4%) people had a bachelor's or higher degree, and 288 (12.7%) people had no formal qualifications. The median income was $33,300, compared with $31,800 nationally. 312 people (13.8%) earned over $70,000 compared to 17.2% nationally. The employment status of those at least 15 was that 1,314 (58.2%) people were employed full-time, 285 (12.6%) were part-time, and 138 (6.1%) were unemployed.

Education 
Whitiora school was founded in October 1919, though a Whitiora school was mentioned in 1916. It was built for 160, but Hamilton was growing so fast that 3 extra rooms had to be added before opening, as too many children wanted to attend. In 1920 it was extended to cater for another 200, but by 1923 it was again overcrowded.

The primary school is for years 1 to 8.

Infrastructure

Roads 
Whitiora was on the Great South Road, called Jersey Street until 1913, when the name Victoria Street was extended to it.

The surface of Victoria Street was improved in 1914, with gravel added in 1929 and asphalt being laid on roads and footpaths by 1935.

There was a proposal to divert the main road from Victoria Street in 1930, but it wasn't until the 1960s that Ulster Street was extended to absorb Gurnell Avenue and form a 4-lane main road, by putting Waitewhiriwhiri Stream in a culvert and filling the valley. A 2019 plan proposed to investigate restoring a link by putting a pedestrian and cycling tunnel parallel with the culvert. It remained part of SH1 until Avalon Drive opened in 1992.

Power 
Gas pipes were extended into the suburb in 1921. An electric substation was built near No.1 Bridge in 1922.

Waste 
From 1922 to 1973 Hamilton West rubbish dump occupied , bounded by Willoughby Street Cemetery, Waitawhiriwhiri Stream and Ulster Street. Provision was made to stop leachate reaching the stream and gas entering nearby properties, when the rugby training ground in Beetham Park was built in 2009.

Sewage 
Until 1976 Waitawhirwhiri Stream was one of the locations for septic tanks, which were emptied into the stream.

Notable people 

 Rufus Rogers, Labour MP, attended Whitiora School
 Ray Shannon, butterfly collector, attended Whitiora School

See also 
 List of streets in Hamilton
Suburbs of Hamilton, New Zealand
Whitiora Bridge

References

Suburbs of Hamilton, New Zealand
Populated places on the Waikato River